Chenna may refer to:

Aïcha Chenna (1941–2022), Moroccan social worker, women's rights advocate and activist
Chenna massacre, civilians killed during the Tigray War in Ethiopia in 2021
Chhena, cheese curds on the Indian subcontinent